Martin Dimitrov (born 20 March 1996) is a Bulgarian footballer who plays as a goalkeeper.

Career

Botev Plovdiv 
Dimitrov bеgan his youth career with Maritsa Plovdiv before moving to Botev Plovdiv. On 24 April 2016, he made his debut for the team in the A Group in the local derby against Lokomotiv Plovdiv.

Nesebar (loan)
On 16 June 2017, he was sent on loan to Maritsa Plovdiv but a week later the deal was cancelled and he moved to Nesebar.

Career statistics

Club

Honours
Botev Plovdiv
Bulgarian Cup: 2016–17

References

External links
 

Living people
1996 births
Bulgarian footballers
Botev Plovdiv players
PFC Nesebar players
FC Tsarsko Selo Sofia players
First Professional Football League (Bulgaria) players
Second Professional Football League (Bulgaria) players
Association football goalkeepers
Footballers from Plovdiv